Alexander Fedorovich Taran (born 1951), known as The Voroshilov Sharpshooter, is a Russian beekeeper who committed a series of attempted and accomplished murders in order to avenge the death of his children.

Biography 
After his service in the army, Taran began working at a sovkhoz as a zoo technician, fireman and inspector. During the market reforms, he became a beekeeper. He had a house, farm, wife and two children: Natalia (1974-1994) and Vladimir (1977-2001). But in the mid-1990s, his family began to have problems. His daughter Natalia fell in love with a drug addict and soon began taking drugs herself. In June 1994, she was admitted to hospital in a serious condition caused by a drug overdose, where she soon after died. Allegedly, she died from an allergic reaction to an injection given by the doctors. Taran sued the doctor Konoplyankin, who was on duty that day in intensive care (according to some sources, the doctor had long suffered from alcoholism), but Konoplyankin was ultimately justified and pardoned.

Alexander's wife, Nadezhda, went to live and work in Greece a year after Natalia's death. Taran stayed in Russia, focusing his care on his son Vladimir, who had a drinking problem.

In October 2001, Vladimir was killed in a fight at a local disco. Izhayev, the nephew of local entrepreneur Magomed Erkenov, was arrested but later released. No further arrests were made and the case was closed. Taran believed the investigators leading the case were bribed by Erkenov.

Revenge 
Taran purchased two AK-47s while in Mozdok and carried out six attacks.

December 31, 2003 Fifteen minutes after the festive Battle of the Bells, Taran opened fire at the windows of Erkenov's house. No one was hurt, and at that time the identity of the shooter remained unknown.

May 21, 2003 Taran shot and killed Erkenov at point-blank range at the gate of his own house.

September 5, 2003 Taran shot at the windows of the house of Head Physician of the District Hospital, Sergey Gresev. The doctor survived, but was disabled by a shoulder injury.

October 20, 2003 Taran killed the senior security officer, Oleg Tanchik (38 years old).

June 21, 2004 Taran killed the Police Chief of the Criminal Department of the Aleksandrovsky ATS, Vladimir Shtan.

November 27, 2005 Taran fired at a commander of a traffic police platoon named Andrei Radchenko with a machine gun. He was injured, but survived. Five months earlier, Radchenko had stopped Taran's Volga, and when he refused to undergo a medical examination, his car was taken to a penalty area.

The investigation took a very long time, as nobody suspected Taran of committing these crimes. Eventually, evidence was discovered by chance. In 2008, one of the villagers from Alexandrovskoye found an AK-47 assault rifle with a homemade silencer wrapped in a bathrobe in the forest. During a walk around the repair shops, one of the local locksmiths identified the silencer and said that it was ordered by Taran, who needed it for a nozzle for a gas burner. Soon after, he was arrested. During a search of his house, a gas pistol was located. Hair belonging to Taran was also found on a machine gun hidden in the forest. A friend of Taran's gave the authorities the second rifle, which he had been storing for Taran. The subsequent examination determined that the 3 murders and 2 attempted murders were committed with these weapons. Initially, Taran confessed to the murders, but refused to cooperate further.

Despite the large amounts of evidence, a jury trial held on May 29, 2009 fully acquitted Taran. The verdict was appealed and protested by the prosecutor's office. On September 3, the Supreme Court of Russia rejected the verdict and set the case for a new consideration. Taran was given a new trial, and the new jury convicted him. On December 9, the Stavropol Regional Court sentenced Alexander Taran to 23 years imprisonment. In addition, the court decided that he must pay 1 million and 50 thousand rubles to the family members of the surviving victims for moral damage. Taran did not plead guilty and together with his lawyer, Vyacheslav Savin, tried to appeal the verdict. On March 16, 2010, the sentence was upheld by the Supreme Court of Russia.

Opinions 
The case of Alexander Taran caused a great resonance throughout Russia. Residents from Alexandrovskoye, where Taran lived until his arrest, expressed mixed feelings towards their fellow villager. Some supported him for attempting retribution, while others condemned him for the bloody mob law. Representatives of the government also responded to the case.

Senator Vladimir Lukin said the following:

Stanislav Govorukhin refused to comment on the Taran case.

According to the lawyer Vyacheslav Savin, there were violations towards his client's rights during the second trial. Some of the evidence against Taran was declared unfit.

The professionalism with which some of the crimes were committed raised doubts about Taran's guilt. For instance, in the case of Erkenov's murder, the killer had previously disabled the surveillance camera near the house and fired a sighting. One of the villagers later said that if Erkenov's relatives were sure of Taran's guilt, they would've already killed him. Oleg Tanchik's mother also expressed her doubts about Alexander's guilt:

See also 
 Voroshilov Sharpshooter (film)
 List of Russian serial killers

References

External links 
 «Ворошиловский стрелок» получил почти четверть века строгого режима
 Documentary film "Beekeeper's Revenge" from the series "Criminal Chronicles"

1951 births
Living people
Male serial killers
Pages with unreviewed translations
People convicted of murder by Russia
People convicted of murdering police officers
People from Alexandrovsky District, Stavropol Krai
Russian beekeepers
Russian people convicted of murder
Russian serial killers
Vigilantes